Attarat Power Plant is an oil shale-fueled power plant under construction in the Attarat Umm Ghudran area,  east of Al Qatranah in Jordan.   The project is developed by the Attarat Power Company (APCO), a partnership between YTL Power International (45%), Guangdong Energy Group Co., Ltd. (45%) and Eesti Energia (10%). It is the first oil shale power plant in Jordan and the largest private sector project in Jordan to date.

History
The project was originally developed by an Estonian power company Eesti Energia (Enefit). The concession agreement between the Ministry of Energy and Mineral Resources and National Electricity Power Company of Jordan, and Eesti Energia was signed on 30 April 2008.  In 2010, YTL Power International bought a 30% stake in the project.

A 30-year power purchase agreement was signed with Jordan in October 2014. The construction agreement was signed on 12 January 2016. The financial closure agreement was signed on 16 March 2017.  At the same time, YTL Power International increased its stake in the project up to 45% and Guangdong Energy Group Co., Ltd. became a new shareholder also with 45% stake. Construction started shortly after.

Technical description
The power plant will have 554 MW gross and 477 MW net capacity. It will consist of two circulating-fluidized-bed units.  

The power plant would consume 10 million tons of oil shale per year which will be provided from the nearby open-pit mine and it is also the biggest mine in Jordan.

The plant is among the largest power plants in Jordan (the largest being Aqaba Thermal Power Station), and the largest oil shale-fired power plant in the world after Narva Power Plants in Estonia.

Financing
The project will cost US$2.1 billion.  Shareholders will invest $528 million and the rest will be financed by $1.6 billion loan provided by the Bank of China and the Industrial and Commercial Bank of China, and guaranteed by China Export and Credit Insurance Corporation. This is the largest private project financing supported by China Export and Credit Insurance Corporation to date.

Construction
The pland is designed by WorleyParson. The engineering, procurement and construction contract was awarded to Guangdong Power Engineering Corporation, a subsidiary of China Energy Engineering Group. The power plant would be designed by WorleyParsons. It would use boilers provided by Foster Wheeler and the turbine and generator by Siemens.

See also

 Oil shale in Jordan

References

Proposed fossil fuel power stations
Oil shale-fired power stations in Jordan
Proposed power stations in Jordan